is a Japanese visual kei metal band founded in 2007 with the concept of "Japanese terror" and "painful nostalgia". Formed by vocalist Mahiro Kurosaki, guitarist Mitsuki Sakai, bassist Hiyori Isshiki and drummer Junji Tokai, each member is represented by a color. They have been part of the independent label B.P Records since 2009. Guitarist Takemasa Kujō has not featured in the band's public appearances since December 2021, but it is reported that he still participates in production and songwriting.

Ranked thirteenth in JRock News top 15 visual kei bands and artists of 2020 and received an honorable mention in the Most Influential Jrockers of 2017.

Career

Establishment and early years (2007–2008)
Takemasa and Mitsuki played in a visual kei band together in Hamamatsu, Shizuoka, called mi'ze:lia. After the group split, they invited their backup drummer Junji Tokai to form a new band in Tokyo. Through mutual friends, Mahiro was invited to be the lead singer. Sakai and Takemasa aimed to establish a band with its own personality and different from the popular bands at the time. Initially, Takemasa envisioned the "disgusting visual kei" concept for the band, which later cemented itself in "Japanese horror" and "painful nostalgia".

Kiryū was founded on September 17, 2007 and their first live performance took place on December 16 at Holiday Shinjuku. Therefore, the band considers December 16th their official formation date. On March 25, 2008, tickets for their first event, Garyou Tensei in Shinjuku Ruido, were sold out. At this event, they distributed the CD "Sakuragarami" for free. In May, the debut single "Another Side" (アナザｰサイド) was released and another version was released the following month. In October, another single was on sale: "Murasakishoku/Saigo no Koi" and on November 26, the debut mini album Shūgetsu Heika.

Rise of fame and big national tours (2009–2013)
In 2009, Kiryū joined B.P Records. They performed at Meguro Rokumeikan on January 17, distributing a limited single, "Watashi.", and on May 15, 2009, the group performed in Takadanobaba Area, distributing the also limited CD "Chimimōryō no Chōryōbatsuko". At the end of the year, they released the single "Tsuki no Hime". Takemasa stated that with this single, the band's concept ("Japanese horror") was finally established. In early 2010, they released their first full-length album, Meikyō Shisui. Copies of the first edition of the single "Ruru" sold out on the same day of release, October 27. On March 2, 2011, the second album "Mugen Hōyō" was released. On September 14, Mahiro contributed to the charity single "Hitotsudake ~We Are The One~", created to help victims of the 2011 Tohoku earthquake and tsunami.

From "Tsuki no Hime" to "Kyōsei" (2011), five Kiryū singles have reached #1 on the Oricon independent singles chart consecutively. Kyōsei was the 12th best-selling independent single of 2011 according to Oricon.

After Kiryū's popularity grew, they embarked on their first tour of Japan's 47 prefectures in 2012. Despite difficulties, such as when Mahiro had an accident on stage and injured his leg, over 15,000 people attended the tour in total and tickets for most shows were sold out. Shukaensen was released in April and the single "Tomoshibi" in November. In October, Kiryū and R-Shitei toured together. Another tour across all Japan started in July 2013. This year, the band released the singles "Etsu to Utsu", "Aienkien" and "Akaimi Hajiketa", and played a cover of "Pink Spider" by hide for Tribute III -Visual Spirits-.

First international shows (2014–2016)
With the release of Kyoka Suigetsu in April 2014, Kiryū started a tour, as usual, and held their first international concerts. The Kyoka Suigetsu Tour featured concerts all over Japan as well as performances across Asia, with concerts in Taiwan, South Korea, China and Hong Kong. The only single released in 2014 is "Amaterasu", on November 19.

The 13th single "Kyūbi" was released in April 2015 in ten editions and is the band's most successful song to date, reaching number four on Oricon Singles Chart. On July 31st, they performed at Nippon Budokan for the first time, after another tour of Japan's 47 prefectures. In September, Kiryū, BugLug, R-Shitei and Vistlip embarked on a four-band tour together, named 4Byoushi. Teaming with B.P Records bands Royz and Codomo Dragon, Kiryū released "Family Party" and the music video for Ryōran Resonance (繚乱レゾナンス) in November.  The three bands went on a national tour together from November to December.

On April 30, 2016, Kiryu took place in Cure World Visual Festival along with other visual kei bands, even groups from outside Japan, a rare occurrence. Hyakki Yagyo, the fifth album, hit stores on June 29th. The tour in support of this release ended at Nippon Budokan on August 29. On October 16, they performed at the visual kei festival Visual Japan Summit.

10th anniversary celebrations (2017–2020)
In 2017, Kiryū celebrated their ten-year career with their first greatest hits album entitled 2007–2017. They also released the double A-side single "Jou no Hana/Oborezukiyo" on October 25, with the song "Jou no Hana" being used as one of the opening themes for Cardfight!! Vanguard.

The four-band tour 4Byoushi took place once again in 2018, with concerts from March 11 to 30. Kiryu was also invited by Dezert for their This is the Fact tour, performing on June 9. At the end of the year, the sixth album Tenshō Rinne was launched and on December 8 they starred on Nippon TV's Ariyoshi Hanseikai television show. In 2019, three singles were released: "Senkō", "Tamaki no Hashi Naki ga Gotoshi" and "Kachō Fugetsu" With a performance at Tokyo Dome, the band celebrated their twelfth anniversary. In late 2019 Kiryū opened their own YouTube channel, that even Gackt starred in.

The single "Watashi Mamire" was produced by Mitsuki and published on March 4. Fan club members could buy tickets for the single promotion tour in advance. On December 16, they celebrated their 13th anniversary with a concert in Shibuya.

Manjushage, Takemasa and Mahiro's break (2021–present)
In February 2021, the single "Nue" was released. At the same time, Mitsuki was diagnosed with retinal detachment and had to suspend his activities until April. They performed for the third time at Nippon Budokan on April 10th, and the concert was also streamed online via Zaiko website. Manjushage, the seventh album, was released on June 23. In August, leader and guitarist Takemasa announced that he would no longer participate in Kiryū's public performances from December 16th, but would continue to produce and compose the band's works.

In 2022, they released the single "Zekū Zeshiki" on February 24 and "Kodoku" on July 13, announcing a 15th anniversary tour, running from October to December. A few days before the tour started, Mahiro revealed that he would be taking a break after the end of this tour, after being diagnosed with anxiety disorder and depression. The remaining three members stated that the band will continue as normal.

My Dragon
My Dragon was a humorous alter-ego group of Kiryū, where the members danced and sang, not necessarily playing their instruments. Mahiro Kurosaki performed as Dandy Maro, Takemasa Kujō as Beauty Tama, Mitsuki Sakai as Charity Miki, Hiyori Isshiki as Panty Hiwai, and Junji Tokai as Pretty JuJu. With the exception of single CDs distributed exclusively at concerts since 2009, they debuted in February 2011 with "Nijigen Complex". In July 2014 they released the single "IDOL Sengen!?". On May 30, 2016, their third and final release took place: "Stardust Dream", where they performed with the concept of male anime idols.

Being a side band, they did few live performances and were sometimes a opening act for Kiryū. The profit from their concerts went to charities, such as helping victims of the 2011 Tōhoku earthquake and tsunami and Kumamoto earthquake in 2016. They used to perform every year on April 1st. On April 1, 2018, they made their last performance and My Dragon ended.

Members
  - vocals (2007–present)
  - guitar (2007–present)
  - bass (2007–present)
  - drums (2007–present)
 
Former members
  - guitar (2007–2021)
Takemasa has not featured in the band's public appearances since 2021, but it is reported that he still participates in production and songwriting.

Discography
Albums and EPs

References

Musical groups established in 2007
Visual kei musical groups
Folk metal musical groups
Musical groups from Tokyo